Karachay-Cherkessia, officially the Karachay-Cherkess Republic, is a republic of Russia located in the North Caucasus. It is administratively part of the North Caucasian Federal District. Karachay-Cherkessia has a population of 469,865 (2021 Census). Cherkessk is the largest city and the capital of the republic.

Karachay-Cherkessia is one of Russia's ethnic republics, primarily representing the indigenous Caucasian-Turkic Karachay people and the Cherkess or Circassian people. Karachays form the largest ethnic group at around 44% of the population, followed by ethnic Russians (27%) and Cherkess (13%). The Cherkess are mostly of the Besleney and Kabardin tribes. The republic has five official languages: Russian, Abaza, Cherkess (Kabardian), Karachay-Balkar, and Nogai. 

The majority of the republic's territory is within the Caucasus Mountains, except for a small strip at the northern edge of the Don Steppe. Karachay-Cherkessia is bordered by Krasnodar Krai to the west, Stavropol Krai to the north-east, Kabardino-Balkaria to the south-east, and an international border with Georgia to the south-west. Mount Elbrus, the highest mountain in Europe, is located on the border with Kabardino-Balkaria.

Geography

The republic is located at the slopes of northwestern Caucasus and borders with Krasnodar Krai in the west and northwest, the Kabardino-Balkar Republic in the southeast, Georgia (including Abkhazia) in the south and west, and with Stavropol Krai in the northeast. The republic is rich in water resources. A total of 172 rivers flow through its territory, with the largest one being the Kuban, Bolshoy Zelenchuk, Maly Zelenchuk, Urup, and Laba. There are about 130 mountain lakes of glacial origin and an abundance of mineral springs. Climate is moderate, with short winters and long, warm, humid summers. Natural resources include gold, coal, clays, and more.

History
The Karachay-Cherkess Autonomous Oblast was founded on January 12, 1922, in the early years of the Soviet Union. It was split into Karachay Autonomous Oblast and Cherkess National Okrug on 26 April 1926. The Cherkess National District was elevated to an autonomous oblast status on 30 April 1928.

In 1943, Karachay Autonomous Oblast was abolished, the Karachay people were accused of collaboration with the Nazis and subsequently deported to the Kazakh and Uzbek republics. Most of the Karachay territory was split between Stavropol Krai and the Georgian SSR. The remaining territory populated by the Cherkessians was known as Cherkess Autonomous Oblast until 9 January 1957 when it was incorporated into Karachay-Cherkess Autonomous Oblast in its former borders due to the rehabilitation of the Karachay.

On July 3, 1991, the autonomous oblast was elevated to the status of the Autonomous Soviet Socialist Republic of Karachay-Cherkessia (under the jurisdiction of the Russian SFSR). With the dissolution of the Soviet Union, congresses of deputies of various nationalities proclaimed:
Karachay Soviet Socialist Republic (Karachay-Balkar: Къарачай Совет Социалист Республика) on 18 November 1990 (renamed Karachay Republic (Karachay-Balkar: Къарачай Республика) on October 17, 1991)
Batalpashinsk Cossack Republic and Zelenchuk-Urup Cossack Soviet Socialist Republic on August 19, 1991 (united as the Upper Kuban Cossack Republic on November 30, 1991)
Cherkess Republic on October 27, 1991
Abazin Republic in November 1991

After demonstrations in December 1991, the Supreme Soviet of Karachay-Cherkessia adopted an appeal for the recognition of the individual republics. Also in December 1991, the words "Autonomous Soviet Socialist" were dropped from the official name of Karachay-Cherkessia.

In January 1992, Russian President Boris Yeltsin was prepared to accept the division of Karachay-Cherkessia and introduced draft laws to the Supreme Soviet of Russia for the reconstitution of the Karachai Autonomous Oblast and Cherkess Autonomous Oblast within the Russian Federation. A commission on formation of three autonomous regions – Karachai, Cherkess, and Batalpashinsk – was established in the Supreme Soviet.

On March 28, 1992, a referendum was held in which, according to official results, the majority of the population of Karachay-Cherkessia voted against splitting the republic and, on December 9, 1992, the republic was recognized as the Karachay-Cherkess Republic.

Politics

The head of the government in Karachay-Cherkessia is the Head (until June 28, 2012, the official title was "President"). Until February 2011, the President was Boris Ebzeyev, a former judge of the Constitutional Court of Russian Federation. Rashid Temrezov is currently the Head of the republic.

Ethnic tension is a considerable problem in the republic. In May 1999, Karachay-Cherkessia conducted its first-ever free regional presidential election. When Vladimir Semyonov, a Karachay, won the election over Stanislav Derev, a Circassian, there were protests by supporters of Derev, with widespread allegations of fraud. A court ruling later upheld the election result, prompting thousands of Derev's supporters to march in protest, many advocating the partitioning of the republic.

Although activity by separatists in the region pales compared to Chechnya and Dagestan, militant groups exist in Karachay-Cherkessia. A car bomb that killed two people in March 2001 was blamed on Chechen separatists. Muslim separatist groups have formed, and dozens of their members have been killed by the Russian authorities. 

In September 2007, the FSB killed ethnic Abazin Rustam Ionov ("Abu-Bakar"), head of the Karachaevo Jamaat (assembly), along with his wife.

Administrative divisions

Demographics

Population: 

Life expectancy:

Vital statistics

Sources: 1970 to 2008; 2009–2013; 2014–...

Ethnic groups
According to the 2021 Census, Karachays make up 44.4% of the republic's population, followed by Russians (27.5%), and Cherkess and Abazins together make up 20.8%.

Religion

According to a 2012 survey which interviewed 56,900 people, 64% of the population of Karachay-Cherkessia adheres to Islam, 13% to the Russian Orthodox Church, 2% to the Karachay and Circassian native faith, 2% are unaffiliated Christians, unchurched Orthodox Christian believers or members of non-Russian Orthodox churches. In addition, 10% of the population declares to be "spiritual but not religious", 3% are atheist, and 6% are other/undeclared.

Notable people 

 Zuhra Bayramkulova - Dairy farmer and Hero of Socialist Labour.

Science
The republic is the home of what was the largest telescope in the world from 1975 until 1993 (the BTA-6), a very large radio telescope (576 meters in diameter, RATAN-600), and the Special Astrophysical Observatory of the Russian Academy of Science dedicated to the study of astronomy. These facilities are located on the bank of the Zelenchuk River, between the villages of Zelenchukskaya and Arkhyz.

Gallery

See also
Abazinia

Notes

References

Sources

External links

 Collection of images of Karachay-Cherkessia, trombicula.narod.ru
Images of Karachay-Cherkessia, travel-images.com
An account of the disputed 1999 election, nupi.no
Collection of images of Karachay-Cherkessia, with a focus on caves, tls-msu.narod.ru
Circassianworld.com
Karachay-Cherkess Republic News Portal
Medical Institute of North Caucasian State Humanitarian Technological Academy

 
North Caucasus
North Caucasian Federal District
States and territories established in 1991
Russian-speaking countries and territories
Regions of Europe with multiple official languages